Mount Ciremai National Park is located around 50 km to the south of the city of Cirebon in West Java, Indonesia. The park extends into the Kuningan and Majalengka regencies south of Cirebon.  The park surrounds Mt Ceremai, an active volcano, the highest peak in West Java. Groups of hikers, including parties of students, often climb the peak although care is needed.

Various types of endemic or endangered flora and fauna are found in the park which include the following:

 Flora:  pines (Pinus merkusii), Castanopsis javanica (known locally as Saninten), Randu tiang (Fragraera blumii), Nangsi (Villubrunes rubescens), Macaranga (Macaranga denticulatan), Pasang (Lithocarpus sundaicus), Elaeocarpus (Elaeocarpus stipularis), various species of fig trees (Ficus), Ardisia cymosa, and Platea latifolia,
 Fauna: leopards, deer (Muntiacus muntjak or Javan muntjac), Echidna (Zaglossus bruijni), monkeys (Javan surili), the Javan hawk-eagle and various species of  python.

See also 

 Geography of Indonesia

References

External links

 
  Short description of the Gunung Ciremai National Park in Official Letter issued by the Forestry Minister, 2004.

National parks of Indonesia
Geography of West Java
Protected areas established in 2004
Tourist attractions in West Java